Natasha David is a German-born American bartender, mixologist, and author. In 2014, David opened the cocktail bar Nitecap on New York's Lower East Side, which was acclaimed by critics and became known for its selection of boilermakers, slushies, and spritzers. David also competed on Iron Chef America. Nitecap closed in September 2020 due to the pandemic concerning Covid-19. In 2022, David authored the cocktail recipe book Drink Lightly, which features 100+ recipes for low and no-alcohol drinks. David has consulted for notable restaurants and bars such as Soho Grand Hotel and Roxy Hotel. Her cocktail recipes have been featured in many publications and books, such as New York Times, Bon Appetit, and The Essential Cocktail Book. Ms. David has also been awarded as Zagat's 30 under 30, Eater's Bartender of the Year, StarChef's Rising Star, and Imbibe Bartender of the Year. She co-owns You & Me Cocktail with her husband Jeremy Oertel. The company is responsible for a range of projects including Paul Sevigny’s Baby Grand and the forthcoming revamp of Pravda‘s cocktail program.

Early career 
Born in Germany, David moved to New York City at 18 and began bartending. She took on bartending roles at Woodsen & Ford, Danny Meyers’ Maialino, Keith McNally's Pullino's, Maison Premiere, Mayahuel, and Donna before opening Nitecap with Alex Day and David Kaplan.

Publications featuring her recipes

Journals 
 New York Times
 Wine & Spirits Magazine
 Bon Appetit
 Nylon
 Vogue
 PUNCH
 Playboy
 Food & Wine
 Imbibe
 GQ
 Details and Travel & Leisure

Books 
 Sherry: A Modern Guide to the Wine World's Best-Kept Secret, with Cocktails and Recipes by Talia Baiocchi (2014)
 Spritz: Italy's Most Iconic Aperitivo Cocktail, with Recipes by Talia Baiocchi and Leslie Pariseau (2016)
 Amaro: The Spirited World of Bittersweet, Herbal Liqueurs, with Cocktails, Recipes, and Formulas by Brad Thomas Parsons (2016)
 The Essential Cocktail Book: A Complete Guide to Modern Drinks with 150 Recipes by Megan Krigbaum (2017)
 Cocktail Codex: Fundamentals, Formulas, Evolutions by Alex Day, Nick Fauchald, and David Kaplan (2018)
 Session Cocktails: Low-Alcohol Drinks for Any Occasion by Drew Lazor (2018)
 Nightcap: More than 40 Cocktails to Close Out Any Evening by Kara Newman (2018)
 Last Call: Bartenders on Their Final Drink and the Wisdom and Rituals of Closing Time by Brad Thomas Parsons (2019)
 The Japanese Art Of The Cocktail by Masahiro Urushido (2021)
 Mezcal and Tequila Cocktails: Mixed Drinks for the Golden Age of Agave by Robert Simonson (2021)
 Drink Lightly by Natasha David (2022)

Awards and recognitions 
 Zagat’s 2014 30 Under 30
 Eaters 2014 New York Bartender of the Year
 Eaters 2014 National Bartender of the Year
 2015 Star Chefs Rising Star
 Imbibe Magazine’s 2020 Bartender of the Year

References 

Living people
1985 births
American bartenders
German emigrants to the United States
Women cookbook writers
American cookbook writers